The Reverend (Kenneth) Arthur (Lambart) Barrett, BTh (b 1960) is an Anglican priest and the current rector of the Arklow group of parishes, previously he was Dean of Raphoe in the Church of Ireland Diocese of Derry and Raphoe.

He studied at the Church of Ireland Theological College and was ordained deacon in 1997, and priest in 1998. After a curacy in Seagoe Parish he held incumbencies in Booterstown and Sligo. In his last incumbency before his elevation to the deanery,

References

1960 births
Living people
Deans of Raphoe
Diocese of Derry and Raphoe
Dean of Raphoe
Alumni of the Church of Ireland Theological Institute